Sava Mrkalj (1783 – 1833) was a Serb linguist, grammarian, philologist, and poet known for his attempt to reform the Serbian language before Vuk Karadžić.

Biography
Mrkalj was born in the hamlet of Sjeničak in Kordun, at the time Military Frontier, Austrian Empire, now Croatia. He attended high school in Zagreb, and graduated from Pest University with the degree of Humanitatis et Philosophiæ Doctor.

It was in 1805 in Pest that he began to devote himself to philological researches, inspired by the works of German philologist Johann Christoph Adelung and others who were working on language reforms. Mrkalj spoke fluent German, French, Greek and Hebrew. He is best known for attempting to reform the Serbian language before Vuk Stefanović Karadžić. In a publication titled Сало дебелога јера либо азбукопротрес / Fat of the Thick Yer, i.e. Alphabet Reshuffling (Buda, 1810), he proposed a simplification of the Serbian alphabet from forty-two to twenty-six letters. His contemporaries were poets and writers Lukijan Mušicki, Ivan Jugović, Sima Milutinović Sarajlija, Jeremija Gagić, Stevan Živković (Telemak), Pavle Solarić, and philologists Luka Milovanov Georgijević (1784–1828), Jernej Kopitar, Peter P. Dubrovsky, and Johann Christoph Adelung. Mrkalj gave his support to Vuk and Kopitar during the Serbian Language Controversy, but retracted everything he wrote when he was threatened with defrocking.

His suggestion was considered radical and indeed blasphemous (since the original Cyrillic in use by the Serbian Orthodox Church at the time had allegedly been created by Cyril and Methodius), so Mrkalj received so much offensive criticism from the church hierarchy that he decided to be tonsured as a monk to prove his orthodoxy in 1811, but was so disappointed with the monastic life that he left the order in 1813. In 1817 he retracted his alphabet reform proposal in a publication titled: A Palinode (or Defense of the Thick Yer).

Later in life, Mrkalj became despondent and was hospitalised in Vienna mental hospital in 1827. Vuk Stefanović Karadžić came to visit him often. Mrkalj died in 1833.

Works
Besides his philological research and writings, Mrkalj is also known as an accomplished poet. His earliest poem Odi, Kirilu Živkoviću (An Ode to Kiril Zhivkovich), dates from his university days in 1805; Jao! Jao! Jao tristo puta (Woe! Woe! Three Hundred Times Woe), an anthology written in 1817; Sonet preslavnu Arhipastiru ("Sonnet To The Renowned Archpriest"), a sonnet dedicated to Serbian poet Lukijan Mušicki who came into conflict with the hierarchy of the Serbian church over the language reforms proposed by Mrkalj and later by Vuk Karadžić; Starac ("Elder"); and a sonnet to Jeleni Dijaković na novu godinu (1828). He also translated some works of Horace. His admirers maintain that no man after Dositej Obradović and before Vuk Karadžić did so much for the Serbian language under trying times and circumstances.

References

 Ђорђе Рајковић: Изабрани списи - Биографије књижевника, Матица српска, Нови Сад, 1950.
Мала Енциклопедија Просвета - Општа Енциклопедија (М-Ш). Издавачко предузеће "Просвета", Београд 1959.
 Меша Селимовић: За и против Вука, Beograd 1967.
 Вукосава Опачић - Лекић: Сава Мркаљ: живот и дјело, „Матица српска“, Нови Сад 1978.
Mile Mrkalj: Sjeničak - kronika kordunaškog sela,"Historijski arhiv", Karlovac 1980. 
Гојко Николиш: Сава Мркаљ - повијест о једном страдалнику, "Просвјета", Загреб 1980.
Сава Мркаљ: Песме и списи, СКД Сава Мркаљ", Топуско, 1994. приредио Жарко Ружић.
 Jovan Skerlić Istorija nove srpske književnosti, Beograd, 1914
 Гојко Николиш: Сава Мркаљ - повијест о једном страдалнику, „Просвјета“, Загреб 1980.
 Milan Moguš i Josip Vončina: "Salo debelog jera libo azbukoprotres" Save Mrkalja, JAZU i Skupština općine Karlovac, Zagreb 1983.
 Сава Мркаљ: Песме и списи, СКД „Сава Мркаљ“ Топуско, 1994. приредио Жарко Ружић.
 Милош Окука: "Сало дебелог јера либо азбукопретрес" Сава Мркаљ у старом и новом руху, „СКД Просвјета“, Загреб 2010.
 An den Anfängen der serbischen Philologie/На почецима српске филологије: "Salo Debeloga Jera Libo Azbukoprotres" Von Sava Mrkalj (1810-2010) "Сало дебелог јера либо азбукопретрес" Савe Мркаљa (1810-2010), Herausgegeben/Приредили Gordana Ilić Marković, Anna Kretschmer und Miloš Okoka, Frankfurt am Main: Peter Lang Internationaler Verlag der Wissenschaften, 2012.

External links
Translated works by Sava Mrkalj

1783 births
1833 deaths
People from Karlovac
Serbs of Croatia
Linguists from Serbia
19th-century Serbian people
Serbian male poets
Linguists from the Austrian Empire
Poets from the Austrian Empire